Bhalji Pendharkar (3 May 1897 – 26 November 1994) was a film personality in India, and recipient of Dadasaheb Phalke Award, the most prestigious award in the field.

Early life and family
Born to Radhabai and her husband Dr Gopal Pendharkar in a Brahmin family, Bhalji was related to quite a few film personalities in Indian film industry. A number of his close relations achieved fame in the Indian film industry. They include his elder brother Baburao Pendharkar, half-brother and actor-Director, Master Vinayak Karnataki, and maternal cousin V Shantaram.

Personal life
Bhalji had two wives. One of whom, Leela Chandragiri, acted and sang in Hindi and Marathi films in 1930s under the name Miss Leela. Leela-bai already had two children when she first met Bhalji. Bhalji adopted both of them, a boy (Jayasingh) and a girl. The girl later married novelist Ranjit Desai and she is better known as Madhavi Desai (died in 2013); she wrote the book 'Naacha Ga Ghumaa'. His second daughter's name was Saroj Chindarkar.

Bhalji's son with his first wife, Prabhakar Pendharkar (1933–2010), was associated with making of Do Aankhen Barah Haath in 1950s, wrote the book रारंगढांग, and was author-director of noteworthy documentaries. Bhalji named his studio Jayaprabha, combining in it the names of Leela's son Jayasingh (whom Bhalji had adopted) and his own son Prabhakar.

Film career
Bhalji started his career in the era of silent films. He was associated with Prabhat Film Company's earliest talkies, and also worked with other studios in hometown of Kolhapur. Later he acquired his own studio in form of Jayprabha Studio and became a film producer and director. He also wrote lyrics for some film songs in Marathi. His more famous films are: Netaji Palkar, Thoratanchi Kamala, Chhatrapati Shivaji, Mohityanchi Manjula, Maratha Titutka Melvava, Sadhi Manse, Tambdi Maati. Hindi: Maharathi Karna, Valimi, Chhatrapati Shivaji.Ganimi Kawa

Bhalji was awarded the Dadasaheb Phalke Award in 1991 by the Indian Government.

List of successful movies directed

Films Written

As producer
 1939 Netaji Palkar
 1927 Vande Mataram Ashram

As actor
 1924 Prithvi Vallabh

References

External links
 
 Bhalji Pendharkar Cultural Centre, Kolhapur

20th-century Indian film directors
Hindi-language film directors
Marathi film directors
Marathi film producers
Dadasaheb Phalke Award recipients
1897 births
1994 deaths